The 2007 Rafael Nadal tennis season officially began on 1 January 2007 with the start of the Chennai Open.

Year summary 
Rafael Nadal started the year by playing in six hard-court tournaments. He lost in the semifinals and first round of his first two tournaments and then lost in the quarterfinals of the Australian Open to eventual runner-up Fernando González. After another quarterfinal loss at the Dubai Tennis Championships, he won the 2007 Indian Wells Masters, before Novak Djokovic defeated him in the quarterfinals of the 2007 Miami Masters.

He played five clay-court tournaments in Europe after that, winning the titles at the Masters Series Monte Carlo, the Open Sabadell Atlántico in Barcelona, and the Masters Series Internazionali BNL d'Italia in Rome. He lost to Roger Federer in the final of the Masters Series Hamburg. This defeat ended his 81-match winning streak on clay, which is the male Open Era record for consecutive wins on a single surface. He then rebounded to win the French Open for the third straight year, defeating Federer once again in the final.

Between the tournaments in Barcelona and Rome, Nadal defeated Federer in the "Battle of Surfaces" exhibition match in Mallorca, Spain, with the tennis court being half grass and half clay.

Nadal played the Artois Championships at the Queen's Club in London for the second consecutive year. As in 2006, Nadal was upset in the quarterfinals. Nadal then won consecutive five-set matches during the third and fourth rounds of Wimbledon before being beaten by Federer in the five-set final. This was Federer's first five-set match at Wimbledon since 2001.

In July, Nadal won the clay court Mercedes Cup in Stuttgart, which proved to be his last title of the year. He played three important tournaments during the North American summer hard court season. He was a semifinalist at the Masters Series Rogers Cup in Montreal before losing his first match at the Western & Southern Financial Group Masters in Cincinnati. He was the second-seeded player at the US Open, but was defeated in the fourth round by David Ferrer.

After a month-long break from tournament tennis, Nadal played the Mutua Madrileña Masters in Madrid and the BNP Paribas Masters in Paris. David Nalbandian upset him in the quarterfinals and final of those tournaments. To end the year, Nadal won two of his three round robin matches to advance to the semifinals of the Tennis Masters Cup in Shanghai, where Federer defeated him in straight sets.

During the second half of the year, Nadal battled a knee injury suffered during the Wimbledon final. In addition, there were rumors at the end of the year that the foot injury he suffered during 2005, caused long-term damage, which were given credence by coach Toni Nadal's claim that the problem was "serious". Nadal and his spokesman strongly denied this, however, with Nadal himself calling the story "totally false".

Singles matches

See also
 2007 ATP Tour
 2007 Roger Federer tennis season

References

External links 
  
 ATP tour profile

Rafael Nadal tennis seasons
Nadal, Rafael
Rafael Nadal
2007 in Spanish sport